Dikkiloona  is a 2021 Indian Tamil-language science fiction comedy film written and directed by Karthik Yogi. The film stars Santhanam, Anagha and Shirin Kanchwala, while Yogi Babu, Harbhajan Singh, Rajendran and Anandaraj play supporting roles. The film features music composed by Yuvan Shankar Raja, with cinematography and editing were performed respectively by Arvi and Jomin. The film was released on ZEE5 on 10 September 2021, coinciding with the occasion of Ganesh Chaturthi, and received mixed reviews from critics.

Plot 
Mani, an ex-hockey player leads a stressful married life, and works as a lineman for the electricity board. While trying to solve an issue, he meets a group of scientists who are developing a time machine. He uses it to travel back to 2020 and change the root cause of all his problems.

Mani in the year 2027 is not in good terms with his wife Priya and his parents-in-law as he did not achieve big as a hockey player and instead works as EB Lineman with meagre amount of salary. Priya is upset with him as she thinks Mani cheated her regarding his career as hockey player. She keeps throwing tantrums on him which makes Mani frustrated. Mani with help of his friend Albert, who works as a cleaner in a scientists team who work on making a Time travel device to work, travels through time in backwards just 2 days before his wedding with Priya in the year 2020. Mani introduces himself to his past version as EB Mani and the groom Mani does not believe him and rather doubts he must be a doppelganger born out of his father's illicit relationship. But when Mani reveals about few things which he only knew, groom Mani believes him. EB Mani demands him to stop the marriage but groom Mani refuses. EB Mani blackmails him with a video and tells if he does not stop his marriage, he will circulate the video to everyone. EB Mani also gives his exit watch to groom Mani and tells him to travel to his future in 2027 so that he will understand why insists to stop the wedding. Groom Mani travels to 2027. He is shocked to see his then wife Priya who is not having good relationship with him and his family. His parent-in-law are also not giving any respect. He has not achieved in Hockey and works only as an ordinary technician in Electricity board. Groom Mani is devastated that Priya regrets for marrying him and tells him that had this marriage not happened both of them would have led a happy life elsewhere.  Groom Mani also understands that Priya's friend Meghna is the woman who will be an apt wife for him as she is so supportive of him even during his downfall. She had also divorced her husband Karthik who she thinks is unworthy of her. Groom Mani returns to 2020 and stops the marriage with Priya and proposes to Meghna (Groom Mani intervenes during the timeline of Meghna being proposed to by Karthik).

EB Mani is now in the new timeline in 2027. He is happy that he had achieved as hockey player but shocked that he is in final stage of divorce with Meghna. Mani drops the divorce proposal without knowing why he filed for divorce and both start to live together again. Mani now understands why he filed for divorce. Meghna is a spoilt brat from rich family. She always wants to be in limelight and goes to any extent together with her so-called boy bestie to gain likes in social media Tik-tok which reflects in his career when he loses his national team selection match. EB Mani is neither able to live with Meghna nor able to change her. He regrets his decision of changing the past. He tries to get in contact with Priya who is now working in a small restaurant as waitress shocking Mani. Priya apologizes to him for forcing him to marry her when she knew he is not willing to. She is feeling guilty of aborting their child after the wedding was stopped. EB Mani now decides to change everything back to normal again. With help of Albert in the new timeline, he once again invokes the time travel machine to go to the same day when he tried to stop the wedding. However, one of the scientists is angry at him for using the device for his personal benefit, and therefore tampers with the machine half way during his travel which leads to EB Mani ending up in a mental asylum.

After much struggles in mental asylum he arrives on time when EB Mani has sent groom Mani to 2027 and groom Mani returns to 2020 after his time travel. Both Manis are surprised to see their alternate self introducing him as Goundamani. Groom Mani is confused as EB Mani urges to stop the wedding while new Mani tells not to after he explains about his experiences in new timeline. When groom Mani refuses to marry Priya, new Mani tells that Priya is pregnant and she is not as bad as understood by them. Groom Mani goes to Priya just few minutes before the marriage and confesses that he may or may not be a successful person in future and if she is willing to accept him still, they can marry. While waiting in mandap regarding the decision, Priya arrives to mandap to Mani's surprise. She tells she is ready to marry him because he told her the truth. Priya and Mani happily marry. EB Mani and new Mani disappear to their new timeline. Meghna is proposed to by Karthik.

In new 2027 Mani sees himself as successful hockey player, father of a daughter and Priya as his wife screaming at him for silly reasons. This time Mani is not irritated by her and rather sees her in different perspective.

Cast

Production

Development 
On 5 September 2019, KJR Studios announced its collaboration with K. S. Sinish's newly formed production house Soldiers Factory, for a science fiction comedy film titled Dikkiloona, and further stated that Santhanam will star in the film in triple roles for the first time, as protagonist, antagonist as well as a comedian. The film also features him in the nude for a scene. The film's title was inspired from the word "Dikkilona" which was used by Goundamani and Senthil in the film Gentleman (1993).

Casting 
In October 2019, the makers announced that former Indian cricketer Harbhajan Singh would play the supporting role in the project, eventually marking his debut in Tamil cinema. The following month, Anagha who played lead role in Natpe Thunai was cast in the female lead role alongside Shirin Kanchwala. Munishkanth, Anandaraj, Yogi Babu, Rajendran and Nizhalgal Ravi, Sha Ra and Arun Alexander joined the cast in the same month, along with film critic Prasanth Rangaswamy, in his acting debut.

Filming 
The principal photography of the film commenced in November 2019 with the film being mostly set in Chennai. Harbhajan Singh began shooting for his portion of the film in December 2019. The filming was wrapped up in March 2020 before the COVID-19 lockdown in India.

Music 

The music for the film is composed by Yuvan Shankar Raja, collaborating for the first time with Santhanam after the latter's transformation into lead roles, with lyrics written by Ku. Karthik, Arunraja Kamaraj and Saravedi Saran. Yuvan remixed a popular classical song Per Vachalum Vaikama Ponalum from Michael Madana Kama Rajan (1990) which was composed by his father Ilaiyaraaja, and was released as a single on 3 September 2021. The full album was released by Sony Music India on 6 September 2021.

Release 
The film was initially supposed to have its theatrical release in April 2020 but was called off due to the COVID-19 pandemic in India. KJR Studios announced that the film would be released via over-the-top media service. The film released on ZEE5 on 10 September 2021, coinciding with the occasion of Ganesh Chaturthi.

Reception
Baradwaj Rangan wrote for Film Companion,"The film doesn’t use the time machine concept well nor is it a great vehicle for a leading man." M Suganth of The Times of India gave 3.0 out of 5 stars and stated that "It is these scenes that rescue the film and make us wonder if this material would have worked better if the director had chosen to make it as an out-and-out comedy. In its present state, it is merely diverting fare that you forget once it ends."

Controversies 
Santhanam's mockery of disabled people in the film was met with harsh condemnation from various social activists.

References

External links 
 

2020s Tamil-language films
2021 direct-to-video films
2021 films
Film productions suspended due to the COVID-19 pandemic
Films about time travel
Films not released in theaters due to the COVID-19 pandemic
Films postponed due to the COVID-19 pandemic
Films scored by Yuvan Shankar Raja
Indian direct-to-video films
Indian science fiction comedy films
ZEE5 original films